San Ferdinando di Puglia is a town and comune in the Province of Barletta-Andria-Trani in the Apulia region of southeast Italy.

Twin towns
 Lariano, Italy
 Carapelle, Italy

References

Cities and towns in Apulia